Park Min-kyung (born 16 December 1996) is a South Korean weightlifter. She won the bronze medal in the women's 64kg event at the 2021 World Weightlifting Championships held in Tashkent, Uzbekistan.

She also competed in the women's 64kg event at the 2018 World Weightlifting Championships held in Ashgabat, Turkmenistan.

References

External links 
 

Living people
1996 births
Place of birth missing (living people)
South Korean female weightlifters
World Weightlifting Championships medalists
21st-century South Korean women